The North Bucks & District Football League, commonly referred to as simply the North Bucks League, is a competition affiliated to the Berks & Bucks County Football Association featuring amateur association football clubs primarily in Northern Buckinghamshire, England, although there are members from the surrounding counties of Oxfordshire, Northamptonshire and Bedfordshire. The league was established in 1911 and is split into four divisions: the Premier Division, the Intermediate Division, Division One and Division Two, which sit in the 12th to 15th tiers of the English football league system. The Premier Division sits immediately below the lowest level of the National League System – Step 7.

Format

League

The North Bucks League's 50 teams are grouped into four divisions: the Premier Division, the Intermediate Division, Division One and Division Two, which are made up of 14, 12, 13 and 11 teams, respectively. In any given season a club plays each of the others in the same division twice, once at their home ground and once at that of their opponents. Many of the league's teams are reserve teams of other North Bucks League clubs and full membership (which gives the right to enter at least one team into competition) stood at 34 for the 2015–16 season and is capped at 44 clubs. Sixteen of the 34 also field a second team, but these second teams are barred from competing in the same division, while any club that fields only one side in the North Bucks League but has a first team at a higher level may not enter a team in the lower two divisions of the North Bucks League.

Clubs gain three points for a win, one for a draw, and none for a defeat. At the end of the season, clubs towards the top of their division may win promotion to the next higher division, while those at the bottom may be relegated to the next lower one. The top club in the Premier Division may be promoted to the Spartan South Midlands Football League Division Two, but in practice application to the South Midlands League is separate from this, and is more dependent on the club facilities than on league position. Sometimes clubs are promoted to leagues which better suit their location, such as the United Counties Football League Division One for more northerly-based teams. Clubs are promoted to and relegated from the component leagues of the North Bucks League at the end of each season, but relegation from Division Two is not possible because there is no lower-level football competition in the region in the league system. Division size is capped at eighteen.

The more demanding requirements of the South Midlands League have led to some clubs remaining in the North Bucks League despite continued dominance, as they do not meet or do not wish to meet the standards required off the pitch. Other teams have moved to the South Midlands League from a lower level, skipping the Premier Division. Both Bletchley Town and MK Wanderers moved from the North Bucks Division One to the Spartan South Midlands Division Two for the 2008–09 season, although Milton Keynes Wanderers did resign early in the following season after a string of heavy defeats and resumed membership of the North Bucks & District League.

Cups
The North Bucks & District Football League organises six knock-out cup competitions: the four Challenge Trophy competitions, the Inter Divisional Challenge Cup and the Reserve Team Challenge Trophy. The Challenge Trophy is open to all of the league's teams, but is split into four sections, so that there is a separate competition for each division. The final of each tournament is played at a neutral venue. The Inter Divisional Challenge Cup – known as the Cowley and Wilson Cup for sponsorship reasons – is competed in by all first-team members of the North Bucks League and was re-introduced for the 2010–11 season. The Reserve Team Challenge Trophy is organised in the same manner as the Inter Divisional Challenge Cup but only the reserve teams are eligible. Additionally, clubs may be invited to play in the Buckingham Charity Cup and can enter County Cups organised by the Berks & Bucks FA, although some teams fall under the auspices of other county authorities. Reserve sides whose first teams compete at a higher level (for example in the Spartan South Midlands League) are not considered reserve sides for the purpose of the 2 inter-divisional cup competitions.

History
The league was established in 1911 to serve a similar area that it does today.

Governance
The League Management Committee meets monthly and consists of the following members:

 Kelly Hawkins – League Secretary - League County Rep
 Mick McStraw – Chairman
 Phillip Houghton - Vice Chairman and Referee Secretary
 John Fenner – Treasurer
 Nick Aldren – Registration Secretary
 Marcelle Turner - Results Secretary
 Brian Stuchbury
 Paul Hammond
 David McGwyre

Clubs
Below are listed the member clubs of North Bucks & District Football League for the 2015–16 season. See the 2016-17 results

Premier Division

Intermediate Division

Division One

Division Two

Notable members

Current Premier Division sides Bow Brickhill and Buckingham Town Reserves have competed at a higher level. Bow Brickhill spent two years in Spartan South Midlands League Division One, while Buckingham Town's second string spent a year in the United Counties League Division Two before its departure to a dedicated reserve league.

Former members Buckingham Athletic, Buckingham Town, Brackley Town, Olney Town, Mursley United, Cranfield United and Newport Pagnell Wanderers – now called Newport Pagnell Town following a name change – are among the clubs which have competed at a higher level. Buckingham Athletic are currently competing in Spartan South Midlands League Division One and last competed in the North Bucks & District Football League in 1985, having enjoyed membership for seven seasons following relegation from the Hellenic League. Mursley United play in the division below Buckingham Athletic, having left the North Bucks League in 1996, three years after joining it. Buckingham Town, Olney Town and Newport Pagnell compete in the United Counties League, Buckingham Town and Olney in Division One and Newport Pagnell in the Premier Division. Olney were founder members of the North Bucks League in 1911, but left for the East Northants League after the Second World War before returning in the 1930s. The early 1960s saw the club move back to the East Northants League, then known as the Rushden District League. Shortly after that, they gained promotion to the United Counties League, where they have remained ever since. Newport Pagnell joined the North Bucks League after formation in 1963 before gaining promotion in 1972. Brackley Town are the ex-North Bucks League side that play at the highest level; they currently participate in the Conference North and hold the record the ex-North Bucks League member making the longest run in the FA Cup, achieving an appearance in the FA Cup Second Round Proper in 2013. Brackley played in the League in two spells: from post-World War II until 1968 and from 1974 until 1983. Cranfield United, who never won the North Bucks League, has competed in the Spartan South Midlands League Division One but now plays in the Bedfordshire County Football League.

Past winners

1911–1932
The League originally consisted of just one division. Three seasons of competition were held before the outbreak of the First World War. Competition re-commenced two years after the First World War ended. This is a list of winners for the period in which the League had one division, which ended in 1932.

1932–1973
In 1932, the Second Division was introduced. Seven years later, competition was interrupted by global conflict for the second time in the form of the Second World War. Competition was halted in 1939 and begun again in 1946. This section documents the champions of both divisions until the introduction of a third tier in 1973.

1973–1994
1973 witnessed the introduction of a third division. Named the Premier Division, it sat above Division One and Division Two. This section lists the champions of all three divisions until a fourth tier was introduced in 1994.

1994–2010
The most recent expansion of the league involved the introduction of a fourth division, the Intermediate Division, in 1994.

2010–present

At the end of the 2009–10 season, the League decided to re-introduce the Inter Divisional Cup for the 2010–11 season.

Titles by club
This is an incomplete list of clubs that have been North Bucks League champions in order of success.

See also
 English football league system

External links
Official website
North Bucks & District League on the FA website

References

 
Sports leagues established in 1911
Sport in Milton Keynes
Football in Buckinghamshire
Football leagues in England
1911 establishments in England